Pionier may refer to:

 PIONIER, the Polish academic network
 Pionier, the German-language paper published by Karl Heinzen
 PIONIER (VLTI), an instrument at the VLTI astronomical observatory
 "Pioniere", combat engineering battalions in some German speaking countries

See also
Pioneer (disambiguation)